Xiang Chan (died 192 BC), courtesy name Bo, better known as Xiang Bo, was a noble of the Chu state of the Seven Warring States. He was an uncle of the warlord Xiang Yu, who competed with Liu Bang (Emperor Gao), the founder of the Han dynasty, for supremacy over China in the Chu–Han Contention (206–202 BC).

Xiang Bo is best known for preventing another nephew of his, Xiang Zhuang, from assassinating Liu Bang at the Feast at Hong Gate in 206 BC. During the Chu–Han Contention, Xiang Bo attempted to reconcile between the two warring factions. After Xiang Yu's eventual defeat and death in 202 BC, Xiang Bo and his family were pardoned by Liu Bang and they became nobles of the Han Empire.

Early life
Xiang Bo was from Xiaxiang (present-day Suqian, Jiangsu). He was a son of Xiang Yan, a general of the Chu state. He lived as a commoner under the Qin dynasty in his early days. Once, he killed someone in his hometown and fled to Xiapi (present-day Suining County, Jiangsu), where he met Zhang Liang, who befriended him and helped him evade the authorities.

In 209 BC, when uprisings erupted throughout China to overthrow the Qin dynasty, Xiang Liang and Xiang Yu followed suit and rebelled in Wu (present-day southern Jiangsu), rallying an army of about 8,000 men. Xiang Bo travelled to Wu to join his relatives, and was appointed as an advisor.

Feast at Hong Gate

Three years later, the Qin dynasty collapsed after the last Qin ruler, Ziying, surrendered to Liu Bang's rebel army. Liu Bang occupied Guanzhong (heartland of Qin) and remained there until Xiang Yu's army arrived. Xiang Yu was unhappy that Liu Bang had beat him in the race to Guanzhong and wanted to attack Liu. Xiang Bo heard that Zhang Liang was on Liu Bang's side and feared for his friend's life. He secretly left Xiang Yu's camp and rushed to inform Zhang Liang. Zhang Liang brought Xiang Bo with him to meet Liu Bang and Xiang told Liu everything. Liu Bang knew that he was not powerful enough to resist Xiang Yu, and planned to use Xiang Bo to help him avoid the conflict. He treated Xiang Bo with respect and expressed his intention to marry his daughter to Xiang Bo's son. Xiang Bo was touched and promised to help Liu Bang resolve the misunderstanding with his nephew.

Xiang Bo returned to camp later and successfully persuaded Xiang Yu to give Liu Bang a chance to explain himself. The next day, Liu Bang attended the banquet hosted by Xiang Yu at Hong Gate and affirmed his loyalty to the latter. During the feast, Fan Zeng hinted to Xiang Yu numerous times to kill Liu Bang but Xiang ignored him. Fan Zeng left his seat and called for Xiang Zhuang, instructing the latter to pretend to perform a sword dance and find an opportunity to assassinate Liu Bang. However, Xiang Bo intervened by offering to join in the "performance" and he blocked Xiang Zhuang whenever the latter thrust his sword towards Liu Bang. The staged duel was stopped by Xiang Yu eventually.

Later life
Starting in late 206 BC, Xiang Yu and Liu Bang engaged in a power struggle for supremacy over China, historically known as the Chu–Han Contention. During that period of time, Xiang Bo often tried to reconcile between the two warring factions. The four-year-long war ended in 202 BC with the defeat and death of Xiang Yu. Liu Bang became the emperor and established the Han dynasty.

Liu Bang was grateful to Xiang Bo for saving his life during the Feast at Hong Gate so he pardoned Xiang Bo and his family. In addition, Xiang Bo was enfeoffed as the Marquis of Yeyang (射陽侯), granted the imperial family name "Liu", and given the lands southwest of present-day Huai'an County, Jiangsu as his marquisate.

References
 Sima Qian. Records of the Grand Historian, Volume 7.

Chu–Han contention people
Year of birth unknown
192 BC deaths